Radio City Tower (also known as St. John's Beacon) is a radio and observation tower in Liverpool, England, built in 1969 and opened by Queen Elizabeth II. It was designed by James A. Roberts Associates in Birmingham. It is 138 metres tall, and is the second tallest free-standing building in Liverpool and the 32nd tallest in the United Kingdom. 

When considering the height of the building, it has a 10m long antenna on the roof, making it the tallest structure in Liverpool (including antennas).

As testament to the importance of its design, which was described by Historic England as “embodying the technological bravura and spirit of the space age”, the building was listed at Grade II in November 2020.

The tower takes its name from the main radio station that operates from it, Radio City and its sister station Greatest Hits Radio Liverpool & The North West.

St. John's Beacon  (1969–1999) 
At the top of the tower was a luxury 5 star revolving restaurant, the facade and floor of the restaurant revolving as one unit, while the roof of the restaurant was used as an observation platform for visitors. There are 558 stairs up to the top, and two lift shafts with lifts reaching the top in 30 seconds.

The tower is structurally independent of the adjacent shopping centre, with a simple foundation onto sandstone. Originally it was built as a chimney of the heating system of the shopping centre .The foundation is 60 feet in diameter, 17 feet deep and begins 40 feet below Houghton Street. It has a tapering shaft that was built using slip-formed concrete.  The crows nest structure at the top was then added after the shaft was formed.

The original restaurant closed in 1979 for health and safety issues. It was re-opened, with a reduced capacity and additional fire prevention measures, during the early 1980s. The restaurant was eventually re-fitted as a "Buck Rogers" space-themed restaurant in 1983, but closed again due to lack of business. After this the observation deck and the restaurant remained closed.

In the following years, the tower lay empty and derelict. Often considered to be an eyesore or a “White Elephant” by fellow Liverpudlians, blue "UFO style" neon strip lights were added to the perimeter of the tower in 1994 in an attempt to increase its attractiveness. These were later removed upon the refurbishment of the tower.

In late 1998, Radio City, owned and operated by the then Emap Radio, expressed interest in refurbishing the tower to house Radio City and Magic 1548, including their studios and required office space. The plan was announced to the public and in the interim period, Radio City would regularly broadcast from the beacon and also broadcast during the Lightshow Festival period in late 1999 which involved many different patterned and coloured lights being shone from the tower.

Work commenced in 1999 and was completed in the summer of 2000.

Radio City Tower (1999-present) 
The tower was refurbished in 1999 at a cost of £5 million. It reopened as Radio City 96.7 (and Magic 1548) in August 2000. The outdoor observation deck, which had been located on the roof of the restaurant, was transformed into a second floor. It now holds offices and conference rooms, for both radio stations. The studios are on the lower floor, which was  previously the restaurant. The original revolving structure and machinery were left intact during the refurbishment. Brackets were added to lock the moving structure in place.

The tower has been known to sway in heavy winds. This is a design feature and common in construction within skyscrapers and tall building in order to prevent the building snapping at its base or cracking along the shaft.

During the refurbishment between the 1st and 2nd floor, the Radio City 96.7 lettering was added. It is illuminated in yellow, during dark. Several other lights were added onto the base of the crows nest structure, which is illuminated all day and periodically change colour. During Christmas, a beam of light is fired onto the base of the tower, with a Christmas themed image displayed. The 2nd floor windows are illuminated at night, sometimes with a particular colour to mark certain events. A red aircraft warning beacon sits on top of the tower's main structure.

The refurbishment added an advertising framework at the top of the tower, designed for both a fabric banner and illuminated light boxes.

Window cleaning and light bulb changes are performed by specialist teams, who abseil down the side of the tower.

The roof houses the local 10C Digital Audio Broadcasting multiplex for Liverpool. Radio City and Greatest Hits Radio North West do not directly broadcast from the roof. Their FM signal is transmitted by the Allerton Park Transmitter, along with BBC Radio Merseyside on 95.8FM and Capital Liverpool on 107.6FM

In 2017, the Liverpool-based tech startup Scan And Make organised the first edition of the art contest exhibition "Making Art 4.0" in the Radio offices.

In 2018, an artwork banner was displayed on the beacon's advertisement framework. It was titled Liverpool 2018 , celebrating 10 years since the city's 2008 European Capital Of Culture events.

Radio City Talk ceased broadcasting on 31 May 2020, after it was deemed not financially viable due to low listening figures.

As of September 2020, the tower houses the studios for the local programming of Radio City and National programming for Greatest Hits Radio.

St John's Beacon Viewing Gallery 

In 2010, the Radio City Tower's (St John's Beacon) first floor was opened full-time to members of the public on paying an entrance fee. This fee is £7.5 for adults and £5.5 for children. Visitors can spend as long as they wish in the tower.

Radio stations 
Initially Radio City and Magic 1548 began broadcasting from the tower. However, the tower was actually refurbished with 3 studios and a small recording and news studio.

In 2008 the then City Talk 105.9 started broadcasting from studio 3. Radio City broadcast from Studio 2 and Magic from Studio 1.

In 2015, with the revamp of local stations and the creation of Bauer City 1, Bauer City 2 and Bauer City 3, Magic 1548 became Radio City 2 and City Talk 105.9 became Radio City Talk and swapped frequencies with Radio City 2. A new station, Radio City 3 launched on 19 January 2015. This station did not need a dedicated studio as all output came from The Hits  in Manchester but retained local advertisements. It was later dropped from the lineup in 2017 and eventually, The Hits became Hits Radio UK in 2018.

Radio City is now part of the Hits Radio Network and still broadcasts its locally produced breakfast show, 6-10am weekdays, from Studio 2.

In January 2019, Bauer launched Greatest Hits Radio across the UK with Bauer City 2 stations becoming local outputs. Radio City 2 was rebranded as Greatest Hits Radio Liverpool & The North West. Most of Greatest Hits Radio's programming for the UK originates from Studio 1 including breakfast, as well as local news for Liverpool.

Radio City Talk ceased broadcasting on 31 May 2020 due to low listening figures. In September 2020 with changes to Greatest Hits Radio across the UK, the North Wales naming was dropped and the station became Greatest Hits Radio Liverpool and The North West after to merging with several other stations across the north west. Studio 1 still broadcasts the National weekday breakfast as well as weekend content.

Failed zip-wire proposal 
In late June 2020, a proposal was put up by ZipWorldUK for a new permanent £5 million zip wire that would start from the second floor of the Beacon and end in Liverpool's Central Library. The project attracted mixed public opinions, with many people claiming that it would be a permanent defacing of one of the city's world famous landmarks. Others expressed concerns that the noise of the zip wire could disturb library users. The plan went before the City Council and on 30 June 2020 the plans were approved, however, on 2 September 2020 it was reported that Liverpool Mayor Joe Anderson was withdrawing permission for this use of the Central Library, effectively vetoing the proposal.

See also 
List of tallest buildings and structures in Liverpool
List of towers
Architecture of Liverpool

References

External links
 Radio City Tower at Skyscraper News
 Making Art 4.0 Making Art 4.0 Exhibition in the Radio City Tower 2017.
 

Towers completed in 1969
Buildings and structures in Liverpool
Towers in Merseyside
Observation towers in the United Kingdom
Towers with revolving restaurants